Vishva Lakshmi Devi or simply Vishva Lakshmi  (Nepal Bhasa: , Bíswo Lakshmi Dévi) was the Queen of Bhaktapur and the spouse of King Bhupatindra Malla of Bhaktapur, who ruled form 1696 to 1722. She was also the mother of Ranajit Malla, the last king of Bhaktapur.

See also
Bhupatindra Malla
Ranajit Malla
Nyatapola Temple
Bhaktapur

References

Citation

Bibliography 

Malla rulers of Bhaktapur
Year of birth unknown
People from Bhaktapur
17th-century Nepalese people
18th-century Nepalese people
Nepalese queens consort